Events from the year 1674 in Ireland.

Incumbent
Monarch: Charles II

Events
May 5 – The Hospital and Free School of King Charles II opens in Dublin.

Births
Mary Davys, novelist and playwright (died 1732)

Deaths
September 9 – Murrough O'Brien, 1st Earl of Inchiquin, a chieftain of the O'Briens and Protestant native Irish peer (born c. 1618)

References

 
1670s in Ireland
Ireland
Years of the 17th century in Ireland